A list of notable singers and songwriters from Slovenia:

A 
 Peter Andrej
 Alya

B 
 Janez Bončina – Benč
 Eva Boto

D 
 Nuša Derenda
 Rebeka Dremelj

G 
 Alenka Godec

K 
 Maja Keuc
 Tinkara Kovač
 Vlado Kreslin

L 
 Peter Lovšin

M 
 Hannah Mancini
 ManuElla

P 
 Tomaž Pengov
 Zoran Predin

R 
 Tanja Ribič

S 
 Adi Smolar

Š 
 Darja Švajger

T 
 Andrej Trobentar

Y
 Irena Yebuah Tiran

Ž 
 Mia Žnidarič

References

 
Singer
Slovenian